Albert Andreu Roges (October 25, 1930 – February 23, 2009) was a professional basketball player for two seasons in the National Basketball Association (NBA) as a member of the Baltimore Bullets (1953–54) and the Fort Wayne Pistons (1954–55). He played for the Bullets at the start of the 1954–55 season, but after the team folded he was drafted by the Pistons. He attended Long Island University.

External links

1930 births
2009 deaths
American men's basketball players
Basketball players from California
Baltimore Bullets (1944–1954) players
Fort Wayne Pistons players
LIU Brooklyn Blackbirds men's basketball players
Los Angeles City Cubs men's basketball players
Undrafted National Basketball Association players